The 2011 Southeastern Conference baseball tournament was held at Regions Park in Hoover, AL from May 25 through 29, 2011.

Regular Season results
The top eight teams (based on conference results) from the conference earned invites to the tournament.

 
- Eliminated from SEC Tournament Contention

Format
The 2011 tournament featured a "flipped bracket". This means that after two days of play the undefeated team from each bracket moved into the other bracket. This reduced the number of rematches teams had to play in order to win the tournament. Additionally, the tournament utilized a "pitch clock," limiting the amount of time that pitchers had to throw the ball to 20 seconds. This rule was not in effect when runners were on base.

Tournament

 After two days of play, the undefeated team from each bracket moved to the other bracket.
 * Game went to extra innings
 ^ Game ended after 7 innings because of mercy rule

All-Tournament Team

See also
College World Series
NCAA Division I Baseball Championship
Southeastern Conference baseball tournament
2011 Alabama Crimson Tide baseball team
2011 Florida Gators baseball team
2011 LSU Tigers baseball team
2011 South Carolina Gamecocks baseball team

External links
SECSports.com

Tournament
Southeastern Conference Baseball Tournament
Southeastern Conference baseball tournament
Southeastern Conference baseball tournament
College sports tournaments in Alabama
Baseball competitions in Hoover, Alabama